
Gmina Pacanów is a rural gmina (administrative district) in Busko County, Świętokrzyskie Voivodeship, in south-central Poland.

Villages
Gmina Pacanów contains the villages and settlements of Biechów, Biskupice, Chrzanów, Grabowica, Karsy Dolne, Karsy Duże, Karsy Małe, Kępa Lubawska, Kółko Żabieckie, Komorów, Książnice, Kwasów, Niegosławice, Oblekoń, Pacanów, Podwale, Rataje Karskie, Rataje Słupskie, Słupia, Sroczków, Trzebica, Wójcza, Wójeczka, Wola Biechowska, Żabiec, Zborówek, Zborówek Nowy and Żółcza.

Neighbouring gminas
Gmina Pacanów is bordered by the gminas of Łubnice, Mędrzechów, Nowy Korczyn, Oleśnica, Solec-Zdrój, Stopnica and Szczucin.

References
Polish official population figures 2006

Pacanow
Busko County